The Haldane Mission of February 1912 was an unsuccessful effort to seek détente with Germany and reduce dangerous friction between Britain and Germany arising because of their escalating naval arms race.

The mission by British diplomat Richard Haldane, 1st Viscount Haldane was a failure because Britain wanted a slowdown in the naval race and Germany wanted British neutrality in a future war. The negotiations were initiated by worried businessmen on either side, and continued by the British cabinet on the one side and the Kaiser and his top aides on the other. The collapse came when Germany insisted on a promise that Britain would be neutral and not join a country that started a war on Germany.

According to British historian John C. G. Röhl: February 1912 is rightly regarded as a decisive event in the years leading up to the First World War. Seldom was the incompatibility between Great Britain’s balance-of-power policy of maintaining the status quo and the German Reich’s claim to the leadership of continental Europe so strikingly displayed.

Political lineups

By 1912 the most critical issue threatening British-German relations was the rapid buildup of the German Navy. Both sides emphasized national honor, especially as related to military power. Britain heavily depended on the superiority of the Royal Navy to defend the home islands in the entire British Empire. London decided that the rapid German buildup of the Tirpitz Plan had to be matched by a strong superiority of naval power. Britain had to build at least three major warships for every two that Germany built. Furthermore, Berlin's reckless diplomacy, as exemplified in the 1911 Agadir Crisis made Germany an increasingly worrisome potential enemy, as London moved closer to Germany's two great rivals Russia and France. However the Liberal government was committed to priority of social spending, and had a strong pacifist element that deeply distrusted heavy spending on the Army or Navy, typified by David Lloyd George. In the cabinet he confronted the civilian head of the Navy was First Lord of the Admiralty from 1911-15 was Winston Churchill, a Liberal at this time. Despite his love of naval affairs Churchill agreed with Prime Minister H. H. Asquith and Foreign Minister Edward Grey that the only solution was to have Germany slow down its naval construction.  The solution that holdings mission would propose would be some sort of slow down or pause in the German build up. In return, Britain would offer support for Germany's colonial ambitions, and promise not to engage in aggressive warfare against Germany.

The 1911 Agadir Crisis had been a diplomatic disaster for Berlin, leading to accurate fears that the British would side with France in any war against Germany. France moved its main North Sea fleet to the Mediterranean. Britain moved one fleet from the Mediterranean, where it confronted Austria and Italy, to the North Sea where it confronted Germany and protected France from the German navy.  Berlin did not know what secret alliances London and Paris had reached, but feared for the worse. (Actually there was no formal alliance, but the British government now felt responsible for the defence of France.) The Tirpitz Plan was taking half the defence budget, and even so Britain maintained a dominance in naval power. The Germany army was the basis of its wartime strength, and pro-army advocates finally began to mobilize and demand a bigger budget. However, Germany had a smaller financial potential than Britain, in terms of tax base and borrowing ability. Furthermore the anti-war Social Democratic Party was now the largest party, and a major increase in defence spending was politically impossible. Germany needed a way to stop the ruinous naval race in order to spend more on its army; it hoped also to keep Britain neutral in a war between Germany and France.

At this point in January 1912 two well connected civilians entered the picture, and brokered negotiations between their respective governments. London financier Ernest Cassel was a close friend of both Britain's King Edward VII, and of Albert Ballin head of the Hamburg America Line, the world's largest steamship company. Ballin was a personal friend of the Kaiser.

British draft proposals
A memorandum was prepared by Sir Edward Grey, Winston Churchill, and Lloyd George for the British Cabinet. Cassel brought the document to Berlin on January 29, 1912, where it immediately came to the attention of the Kaiser and his top officials. These proposals were:
1. Fundamental. Naval superiority recognized as essential to Great Britain. Present German naval program and expenditure not to be increased, but if possible retarded and reduced.2. England sincerely desires not to interfere with German Colonial expansion. To give effect to this she is prepared forthwith to discuss whatever the German aspirations in that direction may be. England will be glad to know that there is a field or special points where she can help Germany.3. Proposals for reciprocal assurances debarring either power from joining in aggressive designs or combinations against the other would be welcome. The main goal of the British Cabinet was the first item; the other two were concessions. The first item referred to the current German naval budget. London did not know that a new, much more aggressive naval budget (called a "Novelle") had been drafted in Berlin but not yet approved. The Germans gave Haldane a copy which he took to the Cabinet without reading. The second item was a concession; London was prepared to turn over parts of the old decaying Portuguese Empire. Berlin, however, had no interest in new colonies. They would be of little economic benefit, and instead force a redeployment of the German Navy to defend new holdings in Africa. Berlin focused its attention on the third item—it very seriously wanted British neutrality in a possible war. The German Navy under Admiral Alfred von Tirpitz had mobilized elite and popular opinion behind a new expansion of the Navy, and had just won the Kaiser's approval for its Novelle, despite the argument by the civilian government under Chancellor Theobald von Bethmann Hollweg that considered it too expensive. Germany's civilian government, however, did not control military affairs.  Upon reading the British proposals, Bethmann Hollweg and the Kaiser were willing to cut the naval expansion to achieve it, despite the strong protests by Admiral Tirpitz. The Germans therefore invited a senior British diplomat and Haldane was sent, arriving on February 7 just as the Kaiser was announcing in vague terms the new naval budget that Tirpitz wanted.

See also
 Causes of World War I

Notes

Further reading
 Berghahn, V. R. Germany and the Approach of War in 1914 (1973), a modern German approach.
 Brandenburg, Erich. From Bismarck to the world war: A history German Foreign Policy 1870-1914 (Oxford University Press, 1927), pp 394–417; older German perspective. online
 Carroll, E. Malcolm. Germany and the Great Powers: A Study in Public Opinion and Foreign Policy (1938) pp 705–712, American perspective.
 Cecil, Lamar. Wilhelm II (1989) online; scholarly biography
 Cecil, Lamar. Albert Ballin : business and politics in imperial Germany, 1888-1918 (1967) online 
 Clark, Christopher. The sleepwalkers: How Europe went to war in 1914 (Penguin UK, 2012) pp 318–321. recent British perspective.
 Fay, Sidney Bradshaw. The Origins of the World War (1930) 1:300-312, older American perspective. online
 Ferguson, Niall. The pity of war: Explaining world war I (Hachette UK, 2008) pp 135–143. online
 Kraska, James. "Fear God and Dread Nought: Naval Arms Control and Counterfactual Diplomacy Before the Great War." Georgia Journal of International and Comparative Law 34 (2005): 43+.
 Hinsley, F. H. British Foreign Policy under Sir Edward Grey (1977) pp 193–215, British perspective
, British perspective.
 “Lord Haldane’s Mission to Germany: Important Official Conversations at Berlin in 1906 and 1912 Bearing on Issues of the War.” Current History (1917) 7#2 pp. 328–30, online, older American perspective.
 Lynn-Jones, Sean M. "Detente and deterrence: Anglo-German relations, 1911-1914." International Security 11.2 (1986): 121-150.
 Marder, Arthur. From the Dreadnought to Scapa Flow: Volume I: The Road to War 1904–1914 (Oxford UP, 1961) pp 272–287. 
 Massie, Robert K. Dreadnought: Britain, Germany, and the coming of the Great War (1991) pp. 790–817, popular history
 Maurer, John H. "The Anglo-German naval rivalry and informal arms control, 1912-1914." Journal of Conflict Resolution;; 36.2 (1992): 284-308.
 
 Röhl, John C.G. Wilhelm II: Into the Abyss of War and Exile, 1900–1941 (Cambridge UP, 2017), ch. 32 pp 833–73, online; recent British and German scholarship.
 Röhl, John C.G. Kaiser Wilhelm II: A Concise Life (Cambridge UP, 2014) oo 129–134.
 Seton-Watson, R.W. Britain in Europe: 1789-1914 (1937) pp 627-632.
 Sleightholme‐Albanis, Elisabeth. "Sir Ernest Cassel and Anglo‐German relations before the outbreak of the First World War." Cambridge Review of International Affairs 4.2 (1990): 36-43.
 Woodward,  E. L.  Great Britain and the German Navy (1935) pp 323–337, British perspective.

Primary sources

 Churchill Winston S. The World Crisis 1911–1914 (1923) pp 94–99,online
 Gooch, G. P., and Harold Temperley, eds. British Documents on the Origins of the War, Vol. 6: Anglo–German Tension: Armaments and Negotiation, 1907–12 (1930) pp 666–761. online
 Haldane, Richard Burdon. Before the War (1920) online
 Scott, James Brown. “Lord Haldane’s Diary of Negotiations Between Germany and England in 1912.” American Journal of International Law'' 12#3 (1918), pp. 589–96, online

Germany–United Kingdom relations
World War I
Geopolitical rivalry
Naval history of Germany
History of the Royal Navy
1912 in Germany
1912 in the United Kingdom